Eastgardens is a suburb in the Eastern Suburbs of Sydney, in the state of New South Wales, Australia. Eastgardens is located 9 km south of the Sydney central business district and is part of the Bayside Council.

It has a large shopping centre, Westfield Eastgardens at the corner of Wentworth Avenue and Bunnerong Road.

Eastgardens is surrounded by the suburbs of Pagewood, Maroubra, Hillsdale and Banksmeadow.

History
Eastgardens was originally a part of the suburbs of Pagewood and Hillsdale. The suburb took its name from the Westfield Eastgardens shopping centre in Wentworth Avenue which opened in 1987. The site was originally government owned land which was used as an Urban Transit Authority bus depot and also as a Holden car manufacturing plant.

Population
In the 2016 Census, there were 860 people in Eastgardens. 56.3% of people were born in Australia and 52.9% of people spoke only English at home. The most common responses for religious affiliation were "Catholic" (38.3%) and "No Religion" (18.3%).

References

External links

Suburbs of Sydney
Bayside Council